"Sei parte di me" (en: You are part of me) is a pop song and third single by Zero Assoluto from their second studio album "Appena prima di partire". The song was released on June 30, 2006. The group performed the song at the 2006Festivalbar, and won the award for "Revelation of the Year".

"Sei parte di me" is one of Zero Assoluto's most successful singles. It was certified Gold in Italy, and their second best selling song in the country (after "Svegliarsi la mattina".

Music video
The "Sei parte di me" music video was shot in San Quirico d'Orcia, a province of Siena, and it was directed by Cosimo Alema.

2006 singles
Zero Assoluto songs
Number-one singles in Italy